The 1986 Giro d'Italia was the 69th edition of the Giro d'Italia, one of cycling's Grand Tours. The Giro began in Palermo, with a prologue individual time trial on 12 May, and Stage 11 occurred on 22 May with a stage to Castiglione del Lago. The race finished in Merano on 2 June.

Prologue
12 May 1986 — Palermo,  (ITT)

Stage 1
12 May 1986 — Palermo to Sciacca,

Stage 2
13 May 1986 — Sciacca to Catania,

Stage 3
14 May 1986 — Catania to Taormina,  (TTT)

Stage 4
15 May 1986 — Villa San Giovanni to Nicotera,

Stage 5
16 May 1986 — Nicotera to Cosenza,

Stage 6
17 May 1986 — Cosenza to Potenza,

Stage 7
18 May 1986 — Potenza to Baia Domizia,

Stage 8
19 May 1986 — Cellole to Avezzano,

Stage 9
20 May 1986 — Avezzano to Rieti,

Stage 10
21 May 1986 — Rieti to Pesaro,

Stage 11
22 May 1986 — Pesaro to Castiglione del Lago,

References

1986 Giro d'Italia
Giro d'Italia stages